Zero Nexus is the third studio album by the Finnish metal band Shade Empire. It was released March 12, 2008 by Dynamic Arts Records.

Track listing 
 "9 in 1" – 4:38
 "Adam & Eve" – 4:21
 "Blood Colours the White" – 4:15
 "Flesh Relinquished" – 4:49
 "Harvesters of Death" – 3:59
 "Serpent-Angel" – 4:33
 "Whisper from the Depths" – 4:22
 "Ecstasy of Black Light" – 4:11
 "Victory" – 9:32

Personnel 
Band members
 Juha Harju – vocals
 Janne Niiranen – guitar
 Juha Sirkkiä – guitar
 Eero Mantere – bass guitar
 Rasane – drums
 Olli Savolainen – synthesizer

Additional credits
 Female vocals by Petra Lisitsin
 Tenor vocals by Jorma Koponen
 Male speech on track 9 by Graham Wilson
 Saxophone played by Aku Kolari

References 
 Official website
 Zero Nexus at Encyclopaedia Metallum

2008 albums
Shade Empire albums